Beehive Forum is a free and open-source forum system using the PHP scripting language and MySQL database software.

The main difference between Beehive and most other forum software is its frame-based interface which lists discussion titles on the left and displays their contents on the right.

Features
Other features which differentiate Beehive from most forums include:
 Targeted replies to specific users and/or posts.
 Safe HTML posting (malicious code is stripped out), rather than BBCode, via WYSIWYG editor, helper toolbar, or manual typing.
 A relationship system, allowing users to ignore users and/or signatures that they dislike.
 Powerful forum-wide and per-user word filtering, including a regular expression option.
 A flexible polling system, allowing public or private ballot, grouped answers, and different result modes.
 A built-in "light mode" that allows basic forum access from PDAs and web-enabled mobilephones.

Beehive is used by the popular UK technology website The Inquirer on the Hermits Cave Message Board.

Security and vulnerabilities
In May 2007, Beehive Forum was selected as one of the most secure forums from a selection of 10 open-source software tested by Dragos Lungu Dot Com.

On 28 November 2007, Nick Bennet and Robert Brown of Symantec Corporation discovered a security flaw related to Beehive's database input handling. The vulnerability could "allow a remote user to execute SQL injection attacks". The flaw affected all versions of the software up to 0.7.1. The Beehive Forum team responded very rapidly with a fix released, in the form of version 0.8 of the software, later that day.

Reviews
 Review of Beehive 0.5 by ExtremeTech
 Review of Beehive 0.6.3 by Forum Software Reviews

See also

 Comparison of Internet forum software

References

External links
 
 Beehive Forum Help Wiki by ManicGeek Tech Portal
 Beehive feature list on ForumMatrix.org comparison website

Free Internet forum software
Free software programmed in PHP
Free groupware